Nicola Turi (born 5 February 1998) is an Italian football player who plays for Swiss club Chiasso.

Club career
He made his Serie C debut for Vicenza on 4 October 2017 in a game against Fano.

On 30 July 2019, he joined Bisceglie.

On 29 January 2022, he signed with Taranto until the end of the season.

On 11 July 2022, Turi moved to Chiasso in the third-tier Swiss Promotion League.

References

External links
 

1998 births
Footballers from Bari
Living people
Italian footballers
Association football defenders
S.S.C. Bari players
L.R. Vicenza players
A.S. Bisceglie Calcio 1913 players
Calcio Foggia 1920 players
Taranto F.C. 1927 players
FC Chiasso players
Serie C players
Serie D players
Swiss Promotion League players
Italian expatriate footballers
Expatriate footballers in Switzerland
Italian expatriate sportspeople in Switzerland